Kansas's 32nd Senate district is one of 40 districts in the Kansas Senate. It has been represented by Republican Larry Alley since 2017, succeeding fellow Republican Steve Abrams.

Geography
District 32 spans much of the state's southern edge, including all of Barber, Comanche, Harper, and Sumner Counties, as well as parts of Cowley, Kingman, and Sedgwick Counties. Communities in the district include Arkansas City, Wellington, Anthony, Medicine Lodge, Belle Plaine, Harper, Kiowa, Coldwater, Conway Springs, Caldwell, Oxford, and part of Winfield.

The district is located entirely within Kansas's 4th congressional district, and overlaps with the 79th, 80th, 82nd, 93rd, 114th, 115th, and 116th districts of the Kansas House of Representatives. It borders the state of Oklahoma.

Recent election results

2020

2016

2012

Federal and statewide results in District 32

References

32
Barber County, Kansas
Comanche County, Kansas
Cowley County, Kansas
Harper County, Kansas
Kingman County, Kansas
Sedgwick County, Kansas
Sumner County, Kansas